St. John Neumann Regional Academy is a private, Roman Catholic high school in Williamsport, Pennsylvania, United States. It is located in the Roman Catholic Diocese of Scranton.

Background
St. John Neumann is the only Catholic high school serving Lycoming County. It also serves the counties of Union County, Northumberland County, Sullivan County, and Clinton County.

Notable alumni
 Alize Johnson, NBA Player (class of 2014)

Notes and references

External links
 School Website

Catholic secondary schools in Pennsylvania
Schools in Lycoming County, Pennsylvania
Private middle schools in Pennsylvania
Buildings and structures in Williamsport, Pennsylvania
2006 establishments in Pennsylvania
Educational institutions established in 2006